Mulhall United Methodist Church is a historic church at Bryant and Craig Streets in Mulhall, Oklahoma. It was built in 1894 and added to the National Register in 1984.

It was deemed notable as "the oldest church building still intact in north central Oklahoma having been constructed during the Oklahoma Territorial year of 1894 and continuous religious services have been held in it for almost 95 years", and because "it is the oldest and best remaining example of Gothic Revival architecture as applied to a church in north central Oklahoma".

It is a one-and-a-half-story building,  in plan.

References

Methodist churches in Oklahoma
Churches on the National Register of Historic Places in Oklahoma
Gothic Revival church buildings in Oklahoma
Churches completed in 1894
Buildings and structures in Logan County, Oklahoma
National Register of Historic Places in Logan County, Oklahoma
1894 establishments in Oklahoma Territory